The Tucson Toros were a professional baseball team based in Tucson, Arizona, in the United States.

The original Toros were a Triple-A minor league baseball team in the Pacific Coast League from 1969 to 1997, where they won the PCL Championship in 1991 and 1993. They were affiliated with several Major League Baseball teams over the years, most notably with the Houston Astros.

The most-recent Toros were created as a new team in the independent Golden Baseball League on September 1, 2008. They were originally the Mesa Miners (2005) and Reno Silver Sox (2006–2008) before being purchased by Tucson Baseball LLC and relocating to Tucson. The new Toros played their home games at Hi Corbett Field in Tucson, home of the original Toros team, starting May 21, 2009, at the start of the league's fifth anniversary, and ran until 2011. They played in the South Division in the GBL along with the Long Beach Armada, Orange County Flyers, St. George RoadRunners and Yuma Scorpions. (The expansion Tijuana Potros were supposed to play in the same division, but their season was postponed until 2010 due to the swine flu outbreak in Mexico.)

History

Early days
Tucson had a number of baseball teams between 1915 and 1958, including the Tucson Old Pueblos, the Tucson Waddies, the Tucson Cowboys (several teams), the Tucson Missions and the Tucson Lizards. None of these were part of the Pacific Coast League. When the last iteration of the Cowboys folded in 1958, Tucson was left with no professional baseball until the advent of the Toros.

Pacific Coast League era begins
Hiram "Hi" Corbett, a former Arizona state senator, helped to bring the Pacific Coast League to Tucson, in recognition of which the 1937 ballpark in midtown Tucson's Reid Park was eventually renamed Hi Corbett Field. The Tucson Toros, a AAA team in the league's southern division, began play in 1969. The name Toros was suggested by name-the-team contest winner Clarence Dupnik, who went on to become the Sheriff of Pima County, Arizona.

From 1969 through 1972, the Tucson Toros were the AAA affiliate of the Chicago White Sox. During this period, the team managed no better than a fourth-place finish for the season. The Toros did better as the AAA team of the Oakland Athletics (1973–1976), winning the PCL Eastern Division title in 1973 and finishing in second place in 1975. As the Texas Rangers farm team (1977–1979) they finished in third and fourth place, but with outstanding individual performances by outfielder Billy Sample (AAA Minor League Player of the Year, 1978) and others.

The Astros era
In 1980 the Toros began a long association with the Houston Astros. Following the lead of the parent club (which was widely criticized for its 1980s uniforms), the Toros introduced what some consider the ugliest uniform in the history of organized baseball: orange pants with yellow and red stripes, and a jersey with a turquoise back, yellow raglan sleeves, and a front resplendent in yellow, avocado, red, orange, and lime green stripes of various widths. The look in 1981, an all-orange uniform with red and yellow trim, was similarly ill-received.

In their first year of affiliation with the Astros, the Toros won the first half Southern Division title, but were quickly eliminated by the Albuquerque Dukes in the second half playoffs. The team spent most of the rest of the decade in third place for the season. In 1989, under new team owner Rick Holtzman, Mike Feder became the Toros' general manager, a post he would hold through the end of the Toros era of Tucson AAA baseball. His family-friendly promotions brought immediate results. The club was named Promotional Club of the Year in 1990, and had its highest season attendance to date.

The following season, 1991, was the Toros' first championship season. The team overcame a series deficit of 0–2 to sweep the Calgary Cannons in the remaining games of the best of five series. Third year Toros manager Bob Skinner was named PCL Manager of the Year, while series MVP Kenny Lofton led all of professional baseball with 17 triples for the season.

After a second-place finish in 1992, the Toros had their second and final championship season in 1993 under new manager Rick Sweet, winning both halves of the season. First baseman Jim Lindeman led the league with a .362 batting average. Second baseman James Mouton, in his first season above the single-A level, was the PCL MVP with 92 RBI and 40 stolen bases.

The Toros had the PCL's second-best overall record in 1994, and Rick Sweet was named PCL Manager of the Year. In 1995 the team had the best record in the PCL (87–56), but was defeated by the champion Colorado Springs Sky Sox in the first round of the playoffs. The 1996 campaign proved to be the Toros' last as a Houston affiliate. The team went 70–74, while "losing" a number of outstanding players, such as pitchers Donne Wall and Billy Wagner, to major league call-ups.

In addition to Lofton, Wall and Wagner the Astros-era also yielded several future MLB players including Ray Montgomery, Mike Simms, Bobby Abreu, Dave Hajek, Melvin Mora, Phil Nevin, Craig Biggio, Brian Hunter and Mike Hampton.

The Toros become the Sidewinders
1997 was the last year of the Tucson Toros, in more ways than one. In a complicated "swap", the team was sold to the owner of the Phoenix Firebirds, so that the Phoenix AAA team technically moved to Tucson while retaining the Tucson club's staff and facilities. The Toros' former owners moved to Fresno, California as the Grizzlies, and inherited the Firebirds' former affiliation with the San Francisco Giants.

The Toros' long affiliation with the Houston Astros was suddenly over, as the "new" Toros signed a one-year agreement with the Milwaukee Brewers. The one major league prospect with the Toros who was not part of the Brewers' organization was Travis Lee of the Arizona Diamondbacks. The new franchise did not yet have a AAA team of its own, so Lee was assigned to the nearby Tucson team for part of the season. Although Lee personally had a good year, the transitional Toros only managed a 64–78 record. It was the Tucson team's last season at Hi Corbett Field, and their last season with the Toros name.

After the 1997 season, the Tucson club became the top affiliate of the Diamondbacks and changed their name to the Sidewinders. Because the Colorado Rockies used Hi Corbett Field for spring training, Tucson Electric Park was built to accommodate the Diamondbacks and the Chicago White Sox in the spring "Cactus League," as well as the Sidewinders. This ended 60 years of minor-league baseball at Hi Corbett Field. The change was not well received by fans, who responded to the new stadium, affiliation and team name with significantly reduced attendance.

Sidewinders era
With the coming of the Diamondbacks, a new ballpark was needed for spring training in Tucson, since the Colorado Rockies used Hi Corbett Field. Tucson Electric Park was built, and became the spring training site for both the Diamondbacks and the Chicago White Sox. It also became home to the Tucson Sidewinders in 1998. Many changes took place between 1997 and 1999 – a new name, new affiliation, newly expanded league, new owner, new general manager and new venue – resulting in disgruntled fans and lower than expected attendance. Financial arrangements between team owners and Pima County were also the subject of criticism. After purchasing the team in 2000, owner Jay Zucker attempted to improve the situation with a variety of promotions, including weekly fireworks. These efforts met with limited success.

The team was very successful as a supplier of major league-quality players to the Arizona Diamondbacks. Many individual Sidewinders performed admirably in mid-season call-ups, sometimes returning to the major league club time and again as needed. This earned the Sidewinders the nickname "Baby 'Backs."

In 2006, the Tucson Sidewinders won the Pacific Coast League championship, and afterwards defeated the Toledo Mud Hens 5–2 in the Bricktown Showdown for the Triple-A baseball championship at AT&T Bricktown Ballpark in Oklahoma City.

Sidewinders timeline

1997 – Martin Stone, a businessman, land speculator and former owner of the Phoenix Firebirds, purchases the Tucson Toros from Rick Holtzman. The Tucson Toros have a one-year player development contract with the Milwaukee Brewers, filling the gap between the end of the Toros' contract with Houston and the beginning of the team's affiliation with the expansion Diamondbacks. Diamondbacks prospect Travis Lee plays in Tucson for part of the season. Toros owner Stone persuades the Pima County Board of Supervisors to approve a lease on Tucson Electric Park (then under construction) that protects the team owner from a portion of the team's financial losses at taxpayer expense.

1998 – The renamed Tucson Sidewinders begin their affiliation with the Arizona Diamondbacks, playing at Tucson Electric Park. A new mascot is also introduced, Sandy Sidewinder, a snake with arms. The old mascot, Tuffy the Toro, is phased out.

1999 – In May, longtime Toros general manager Mike Feder is fired from the Sidewinders by team owner Stone. A local uproar ensues in support of Feder. He is replaced by Jack Donovan. After the season, broadcasting entrepreneur Jay Zucker purchases the Sidewinders from Martin Stone, reportedly for about $7 to $8 million, after Stone is diagnosed with prostate cancer. The new ownership group, led by Jay and Melinda Zucker, is Tucson Baseball, LLC.

2000 – Zucker loses over $200,000 in his first season as owner. Feder returns as GM.

2001 – Feder leaves prior to the season to take a role as Regional Marketing Director for the NFL's New Orleans Saints. Todd Woodford returns to Tucson as general manager after spending a year with the PCL's Salt Lake franchise.

2002 – Rick Parr becomes the team's general manager. Despite the parent club's World Series win the previous year, the Sidewinders report 268,807 total attendance for the season, an average of 3,895 per game. Tucson Electric Park has a capacity of 11,000.

2003 – Tucson Sidewinders prospects earn the nickname "Baby 'Backs" with their relative youth and frequent call-ups to the major league club.

2006 – The team finishes the regular season 91–53, the best in AAA baseball for 2006 and a new franchise record. Team manager Chip Hale is named PCL Manager of the Year. After defeating the Salt Lake Bees 3–1 in a best-of-five PCL Pacific Conference Championships series, the Sidewinders win the Pacific Coast League Championship Series in three straight games versus the Round Rock Express. They then defeat the International League champion, the Toledo Mud Hens, 5–2 in a one-game playoff in Oklahoma City for the unofficial AAA title. Despite this feat, the Sidewinders still suffer from dwindling fan attendance and a general lack of interest from the Tucson market. After the 2006 season, the Sidewinders renew their player development contract with the Diamondbacks for another two years. Manager Chip Hale is promoted to the Diamondbacks coaching staff as their new third base coach.

2007 – Bill Plummer, the former manager of the Diamondbacks' former Double-A affiliate, the Tennessee Smokies, takes over as skipper for the Sidewinders in 2007. Randy Johnson pitches the home opener as part of a brief rehab stint with the Sidewinders, and picks up a win for the team in his second outing on April 20. Hampered by low attendance and concerns over the location and playing field maintenance at Tucson Electric Park, Tucson Baseball LLC sells the Tucson Sidewinders to SK Baseball LLC for $15 M in June 2007. Tucson finishes the 2007 season with a 75–67 record, the second most wins in Sidewinders history. Tucson Baseball LLC completes sale of the team to SK Baseball LLC on September 12, 2007. Also in September, outgoing Sidewinders owner Zucker announces the formation of a new Tucson baseball team with an old name: the Tucson Toros, to begin play in 2009 as part of the Golden Baseball League.

2008 – The Sidewinders had a win–loss record of 60–82 for their final season in Tucson, finishing in fourth (last) place in Pacific South division of the PCL. SK Baseball relocated the team to Reno, Nevada for the 2009 season, where they became the Reno Aces. The reconstituted Tucson Toros returned to Hi Corbett Field to begin play in 2009.

The Independent baseball era (2009–2011)
In June 2007, owner Jay Zucker of Tucson Baseball LLC announced the sale of the Tucson Sidewinders, the Toro's successor, to SK Baseball LLC for $15 M. The team was moved to Reno, Nevada after the 2008 season. At the time, the Reno Silver Sox of the Golden Baseball League (which began as the Mesa Miners in 2005) were reported to be forced to leave Reno when the Sidewinders move into town. The Silver Sox franchise was sold by the league to Tucson Baseball LLC, but the team's history (including Reno's 2006 GBL Championship) did not go with them. There were original reports of a possible relocation to Carson City, Nevada, but the team instead moved to Tucson. The Silver Sox team name is now associated with the Arizona Winter League team from Saskatchewan. The new PCL team has since become the Reno Aces.

On September 1, 2008, Jay Zucker of Tucson Baseball LLC and GBL chief executive officer David Kaval announced at a press conference at Hi Corbett Field in Tucson that the Tucson Toros were coming back and are now officially a part of the Golden League. Zucker owns the rights to the name, logos, colors, uniforms and history of the Toros. Ironically, it was Zucker who had sold the Tucson Sidewinders team just one year prior to purchasing the new Tucson Toros team.

He and his wife Melinda wore classic throwback jerseys when the announcement was made. However, the team will be donning new uniforms to coincide with the new updated team logo and colors of black, red and gold unveiled at the press conference. The players may sport throwback jerseys at times to pay homage to the original team. Though they entered the league as an expansion team, they have adopted the original franchise's history and records up until 1997, essentially being "resurrected".

In addition to celebrating their return to professional baseball, the Toros celebrated their 40th anniversary of their formation during the 2009 season.

On, September 7, 2009, the Toros captured their very first GBL South Division Championship by defeating the St. George RoadRunners 3 games to 2 and advanced to the GBL Championship Series in their inaugural GBL season. They faced the North Division champion Calgary Vipers, and lost to the Vipers 3 games to 1 in a best of 5 championship series.

On October 27, 2010, it was announced at the GBL website that the Toros would take 2011 off due to the Triple-A Tucson Padres playing their season at Kino Stadium (formerly Tucson Electric Park).

On July 21, 2011, the Toros announced on their website that members of the Yuma Scorpions would play as the Toros in a doubleheader and that it would be the team's final night in action. The reason for their farewell was that the franchise received an eviction notice from the city of Tucson that their lease of Hi Corbett Field was terminated.

On November 29, 2011, the Toros announced that they were folding after agreeing to a settlement of $300,000 paid to the team by the city paving the way for the University of Arizona baseball team to play their home games at Hi Corbett.

Major League Baseball players
Some notable players to don a Toros or Sidewinders uniform:

 Bobby Abreu
 Brian Anderson
 Ronnie Belliard
 Craig Biggio
 Ken Caminiti
 Randy Choate
 Alex Cintrón
 Craig Counsell
 David Dellucci
 Stephen Drew
 Erubiel Durazo
 Adam Dunn
 Mike Fetters
 Phil Garner
 Édgar González
 Luis Gonzalez
 Jason Grimsley
 Conor Jackson
 Geoff Jenkins
 Randy Johnson
 Todd Jones
 Jeff Juden
 Darryl Kile
 Byung-hyun Kim
 Travis Lee
 Kenny Lofton
 Leo Mazzone
 Mark McLemore
 Joe Mikulik
 Damian Miller
 Melvin Mora
 Phil Nevin
 Carlos Quentin
 Shane Reynolds
 Reggie Sanders
 Curt Schilling
 Junior Spivey
 Chad Tracy
 Dave Veres
 Óscar Villarreal
 Fernando Viña
 Billy Wagner
 Donne Wall
 Tom Wiedenbauer
 Matt Williams
 Tony Womack

At least a few of these were "Tucson" players only by virtue of being sent down to AAA for rehab after an injury.

Notable broadcasters
 Mario Impemba (1991–1994), Los Angeles Angels of Anaheim (1995–2001), Detroit Tigers (2002–2018), Boston Red Sox (2019–Present)
 Vince Cotroneo (1989–1990), Houston Astros (1991–1997), Texas Rangers (1998–2003), Oakland Athletics (2006–present)
 Brett Dolan (2000–2005), Montreal Expos (2003–2004, fill-in), Houston Astros (2006–2012)
 Matt Vasgersian (1996), Milwaukee Brewers (1997–2001), San Diego Padres (2002–2008), MLB on Fox (2007–present), Thursday Night Baseball on the MLB Network (2009–present)

Hi Corbett Field
 Hi Corbett Field (originally Randolph Field) was the venue for the original Tucson Toros, and also serves as home of the "resurrected" team. It was built in 1937, remodeled in 1972 and renovated in 1992, 1997 and 1999. It is part of a larger city park complex, Reid Park (which also includes the Reid Park Zoo) and Randolph Park, located between Broadway Boulevard and 22nd Street in midtown Tucson. The largest Toros crowd at Hi Corbett was 12,863 on May 17, 1981, against Salt Lake City. Hi Corbett dimensions are as follows: RF: 348 feet; CF: 392 feet; LF: 366 feet. The park has a "Green Monster" fence in Center Field.

The ballpark was home to the Tucson Cowboys in the 1930s to 1950s, and the spring training home of the Cleveland Indians from 1945 through 1992. Parts of the 1989 movie Major League were filmed at Hi Corbett Field, using the University of Arizona baseball team as extras. In 1993 it became the Spring Training home of the expansion Colorado Rockies, the first major league team in the Mountain time zone.

Despite the 1998 opening of Tucson Electric Park, the Colorado Rockies have continued to train at Hi Corbett. USA Baseball was headquartered at Hi Corbett from 1997 to 2003. From 2004 to 2006 Hi Corbett was home to the Arizona Heat women's pro softball team, with a season from June to August. As of 2009, the venue is shared by the Rockies and the Toros.

The Rockies played their final game in Tucson against the Arizona Diamondbacks in March 2010. Both teams moved their spring training camps to the more lucrative Phoenix suburbs.

Off the field
Some popular Toros promotions included Turn Back the Clock Night, "bull bells" and a cow-milking contest on Arizona Dairy Night, and the annual Diamond Dig in the base paths. Huey Lewis once wrote and performed a theme song for the Tucson Toros (circa 1993). Ray Charles also appeared in concert after a Tucson Toros game in the early 1990s. Toros broadcasters Vince Cotroneo, Mario Impemba and Matt Vasgersian all went on to major league broadcast jobs.

The team mascot, Tuffy the Toro, also appeared intermittently with the Tucson Sidewinders.

The Tucson Toros were featured in an episode of Highway To Heaven, titled "Popcorn, Peanuts and Cracker Jacks." Parts of the episode were filmed at Hi Corbett Field.

Major League, starring Tom Berenger, Charlie Sheen, Corbin Bernsen and Wesley Snipes was filmed at Hi Corbett Field. The Cleveland Indians held spring training in Tucson from 1947 to 1992; to add to the realistic feel of the movie it was shot at the same locations where the Cleveland Indians played.

See also
 Mesa Miners
 Reno Silver Sox

References

External links

 Baseball Reference

Baseball teams established in 1969
Sports clubs disestablished in 2010
Golden Baseball League teams
Sports in Tucson, Arizona
Professional baseball teams in Arizona
Defunct Pacific Coast League teams
Defunct Arizona-Mexico League teams
Defunct Arizona-Texas League teams
Defunct Southwest International League teams
Defunct Arizona State League teams
Defunct Rio Grande Association teams
Defunct independent baseball league teams
Arizona Diamondbacks minor league affiliates
Milwaukee Brewers minor league affiliates
Houston Astros minor league affiliates
Texas Rangers minor league affiliates
Oakland Athletics minor league affiliates
Chicago White Sox minor league affiliates
Cleveland Guardians minor league affiliates
Cincinnati Reds minor league affiliates
1915 establishments in Arizona
2010 disestablishments in Arizona
Defunct baseball teams in Arizona